Petar Tomić (born 29 October 1982) is a Croatian former football defender and current manager of Cibalia Vinkovci.

References

External links
 

1982 births
Living people
Sportspeople from Vinkovci
Association football defenders
Croatian footballers
Croatia youth international footballers
HNK Cibalia players
NK Kamen Ingrad players
NK Inter Zaprešić players
HNK Šibenik players
Croatian Football League players
Croatian football managers
HNK Cibalia managers